Oracle Database (commonly referred to as Oracle DBMS, Oracle Autonomous Database, or simply as Oracle) is a multi-model database management system produced and marketed by Oracle Corporation.

It is a database commonly used for running online transaction processing (OLTP), data warehousing (DW) and mixed (OLTP & DW) database workloads. Oracle Database is available by several service providers on-prem, on-cloud, or as a hybrid cloud installation.  It may be run on third party servers as well as on Oracle hardware (Exadata on-prem, on Oracle Cloud or at Cloud at Customer).

History 

Larry Ellison and his two friends and former co-workers, Bob Miner and Ed Oates, started a consultancy called Software Development Laboratories (SDL) in 1977. SDL developed the original version of the Oracle software. The name Oracle comes from the code-name of a CIA-funded project Ellison had worked on while formerly employed by Ampex.

Releases and versions 

Oracle products follow a custom release-numbering and -naming convention. The "c" in the current release, Oracle Database 21c, stands for "Cloud". Previous releases (e.g. Oracle Database 10g and Oracle9i Database) have used suffixes of "g" and "i" which stand for "Grid" and "Internet" respectively. Prior to the release of Oracle8i Database, no suffixes featured in Oracle Database naming conventions. Note that there was no v1 of Oracle Database, as co-founder Larry Ellison "knew no one would want to buy version 1".

Oracle Database release numbering has used the following codes:

The Introduction to Oracle Database includes a brief history on some of the key innovations introduced with each major release of Oracle Database.

See My Oracle Support (MOS) note Release Schedule of Current Database Releases (Doc ID 742060.1) for the current Oracle Database releases and their patching end dates.

Patch updates and security alerts 

Prior to Oracle Database 18c, Oracle Corporation released Critical Patch Updates (CPUs) and Security Patch Updates (SPUs) and Security Alerts to close security vulnerabilities. These releases are issued quarterly; some of these releases have updates issued prior to the next quarterly release.

Starting with Oracle Database 18c, Oracle Corporation releases Release Updates (RUs) and Release Update Revisions (RURs). RUs usually contain security, regression (bug), optimizer, and functional fixes which may include feature extensions as well. RURs include all fixes from their corresponding RU but only add new security and regression fixes. However, no new optimizer or functional fixes are included.

Market position 

A 2016 Gartner report claimed to show Oracle holding #1 RDBMS market share worldwide based on the revenue share ahead of its four closest competitors – Microsoft, IBM, SAP and Teradata . A 2021 Gartner Magic Quadrant report named Oracle a leader in Cloud Database Management Systems.

Competition 

In the market for relational databases, Oracle Database competes against commercial products such as IBM Db2 and Microsoft SQL Server. Oracle and IBM tend to battle for the mid-range database market on Unix and Linux platforms, while Microsoft dominates the mid-range database market on Microsoft Windows platforms. However, since they share many of the same customers, Oracle and IBM tend to support each other's products in many middleware and application categories (for example: WebSphere, PeopleSoft, and Siebel Systems CRM), and IBM's hardware divisions work closely with Oracle on performance-optimizing server-technologies (for example, Linux on IBM Z). Niche commercial competitors include Teradata (in data warehousing and business intelligence), Software AG's ADABAS, Sybase, and IBM's Informix, among many others.

In the cloud, Oracle Database competes against the database services of AWS, Microsoft Azure, and Google Cloud Platform.

Increasingly, the Oracle database products compete against open-source software relational and non-relational database systems such as PostgreSQL, MongoDB, Couchbase, Neo4j, ArangoDB and others. Oracle acquired Innobase, supplier of the InnoDB codebase to MySQL, in part to compete better against open source alternatives, and acquired Sun Microsystems, owner of MySQL, in 2010.  Database products licensed as open-source are, by the legal terms of the Open Source Definition, free to distribute and free of royalty or other licensing fees.

See also 

 Comparison of relational database management systems
 Comparison of object–relational database management systems
 Database management system
 List of relational database management systems
 List of databases using MVCC

References

External links 

 Overview provided by Oracle Corporation.

 
Client-server database management systems
Relational database management systems
Proprietary database management systems
Database engines
Relational database management software for Linux
Cloud infrastructure
Oracle Cloud Services